Encircle is a 501(c)(3) nonprofit organization that provides support and counselling for LGBTQ+ students and their families at multiple locations in Utah.

History
Encircle was founded in 2016 by Stephanie Larsen. It was set up to help LGBTQ+ youth survive homophobia in the predominantly Mormon communities of Utah, and to help Mormons to become more accepting of LGBTQ+ people.

It opened to clients in Provo in February 2017, expanding to Salt Lake City in January 2018. In February 2019 it moved its Salt Lake City center to a larger site. It opened a location in St. George in October 2020, and as of January 2021 was readying a location in Heber. By June 2020, Encircle had more than 900 monthly clients.

Tyler Domgaard, the Program Manager of the Salt Lake City location, was arrested and charged in August 2020 for the possession of child pornography.

In February 2021, Tim Cook, Ryan Smith, and Dan Reynolds announced they were donating a combined US$4 million to Encircle to open new locations in Arizona, Idaho, Nevada, and Utah. By October 2021, an additional $5 million was raised for the same campaign through additional donors including many business, individuals, and The State of Utah. The funds are being used to open nine new homes, a "Sustainability Fund" and Encircle Cafe.

Relationship with Flourish
In June 2019, Encircle cancelled its relationship with Flourish, a for-profit organization that had provided Encircle's therapy services. The change disrupted patient care, but Encircle said the change was necessary to protect Encircle's non-profit status. Some patients left Encircle in order to continue seeing their existing therapists from Flourish, prompting Flourish to investigate converting to nonprofit status to make the therapy affordable.

Support

Steve Young was one of the earliest donors and supporters of Encircle. He said, "Ensuring a safe, affirming place exists for LGBTQ+ young people to find friends, and for their parents to find support and guidance is vital - and Encircle is the organization to do just that.”

In October 2021, Utah State Governor Spencer Cox voiced his support saying, "Many of Utah's LGBTQ youth face higher rates of depression, anxiety and social isolation, and that's why Encircle is so important. Finding a place for support, encouragement and belonging can make all the difference for LGBTQ youth and families, and Encircle provides that safe space. I'm proud to support Encircle as it serves thousands of Utah's most vulnerable youth."

Donors
The following organizations are listed as "Generous Community Supporters":

 Adobe
 Apple Giving
 AT&T Foundation
 BD.com
 BW Bastian Foundation
 Dancing Llama Foundation
 The Discover Brighter Futures Fund 
 Dominion Energy Charitable Foundation
 E. Rhodes and Leona B. Carpenter Foundation
 Emergent Fund
 Enso Rings
 Eric Rea — Podium
 George S. and Dolores Doré Eccles Family Foundation
 Gold Key Realty, Inc.
 Greyson Chance
 Intermountain Healthcare
 Kahlert Foundation
 Kristen Chenoweth
 Kulynych Family Foundation
 Lawrence T. & Janet T. Dee Foundation
 Loveloud Foundation
 Making a Difference Foundation
 Marriott Daughters Foundation
 Northrop Grumman Foundation
 NuSkin
 The Richard K. and Shirley S. Hemingway Foundation 
 Sam and Diane Stewart Family Foundation
 SelectHealth
 Utah County Cares
 Utah State Legislature
 UPS Foundation
 Walmart Giving
 WayOUT LGBTQ+ Foundation
 Weyerhaeuser Giving Fund
 Willard L. Eccles Charitable Foundation
 Young Living
 Zion's Bank

References

External links

GuideStar profile

LGBT youth organizations based in the United States
Suicide prevention
Sexuality and Mormonism
LGBT Latter Day Saint organizations
Latter Day Saint movement in Utah
LGBT organizations in the United States
Organizations established in 2016
LGBT and Mormonism
LGBT culture in Utah